The Dauphin County Courthouse is a government building of Dauphin County located in the county seat, Harrisburg, Pennsylvania. It was listed on the National Register of Historic Places on August 2, 1993.

History 
The current building is the third county courthouse built in Dauphin County. The first courthouse was built in 1792 at Market and Court Streets. The first courthouse was removed in 1860 and the second was built in its location. The second building was removed in 1948. Plans were drawn up for a new courthouse in 1938 due to complaints about the deteriorating conditions of the building.  The current courthouse was designed in 1940 by the Harrisburg architectural firm Lawrie and Green. It was completed in 1942. The interior artwork was done by sculptor C. Paul Jennewein.

See also 
 National Register of Historic Places listings in Dauphin County, Pennsylvania
 List of state and county courthouses in Pennsylvania

References 

County courthouses in Pennsylvania
Buildings and structures in Harrisburg, Pennsylvania
Government buildings completed in 1942
Courthouses on the National Register of Historic Places in Pennsylvania
National Register of Historic Places in Harrisburg, Pennsylvania
1942 establishments in Pennsylvania
1940s architecture in the United States
Neoclassical architecture in Pennsylvania
Stripped Classical architecture in the United States